Capital punishment is a legal penalty in the U.S. state of Arkansas.

Since 1820, a total of 505 individuals have been executed. According to the Arkansas Department of Correction, as of January 16, 2019, a total of 29 men were under a sentence of death in the state.

History
All but four executions carried out before 1913 were by hanging. Four guerillas were shot on July 29, 1864.

On July 25, 1902, seven men were hanged, the most executions in one day in the state.

Almost all executions were for crimes that involved murder. A number of people were also executed for rape and there was one execution for espionage, 17-year-old alleged Confederate spy David O. Dodd, hanged by Union soldiers on January 8, 1864.

In 1913, the method used was changed to the electric chair. The electric chair was constructed from the wood that had previously made up the state gallows. This electric chair would be used for all electrocutions up until 1964. Four more people were hanged in the state — one in 1913, two in 1914 and one in 1930.

The last execution in the state before Furman v. Georgia was that of Charles Fields on January 24, 1964 for rape. New capital punishment laws were passed in Arkansas and came into force on March 23, 1973. The first execution would not come until June 18, 1990 when John Swindler was electrocuted. His was the first and only execution so far on the new electric chair constructed by the state in the 1970s.

According to Michael L. Radelet of the University of Colorado there have been two instances of executions that did not go according to plan in Arkansas since Furman. On January 24, 1992 the execution of Ricky Ray Rector was delayed by fifty minutes after the medical staff were unable to find a suitable vein in his arm. The curtain over the witness area was not drawn, and witnesses heard Rector moan loudly eight times. State officials attributed the difficulties to his size and use of antipsychotic medication. The execution of Christina Marie Riggs faced similar delays on May 2, 2000, when staff were unable to locate a vein in her elbow. They eventually found one in her wrist.

There have been at least three death penalty volunteers in Arkansas: Ronald Gene Simmons, Christina Marie Riggs, and Clay King Smith.

In April 2017, the state planned to execute eight death row inmates before the stocks of the sedative Midazolam expired at the end of April, but ultimately just four of them were put to death that month. A federal judge initially issued an injunction preventing the executions, but the Arkansas Supreme court overturned the ruling and the United States Supreme Court rejected a claim that the accelerated execution schedule was "cruel and unusual punishment." On April 20, at about 11:30 PM CST, they were allowed to proceed. At 11:56 PM CST, four minutes prior to the expiration of his execution warrant, Ledell Lee was executed, making him the first inmate in Arkansas to be executed since 2005. On April 24, Jack Harold Jones and Marcel Williams were executed, the first double execution in the United States in 17 years.

Legal process 
When the prosecution seeks the death penalty, the sentence is decided by the jury and must be unanimous.

In case of a hung jury during the penalty phase of the trial, a life sentence is issued, even if a single juror opposed death (there is no retrial).

The Governor of Arkansas has the power of clemency with respect to death sentences. The governor receives for that purpose  a non-binding report from the Arkansas Board of Pardons and Paroles.

The method of execution is lethal injection. If lethal injection is ever ruled unconstitutional, electrocution shall be used to replace it.

Executions in Arkansas are currently performed at the Cummins Unit.

Capital crimes
The following are capital crimes in Arkansas: 
 Treason; and
 Murder involving one of the following aggravating factors:
The murder was committed by an offender imprisoned as a result of a felony conviction.
The murder was committed by an offender escaped after being sentenced to imprisonment as a result of a felony conviction.
The offender previously committed another felony, an element of which was the use or threat of violence to another person or the creation of a substantial risk of death or serious physical injury to another person.
The offender in the commission of the capital murder knowingly created a great risk of death to a person other than the victim or caused the death of more than one person in the same criminal episode.
The murder was committed for the purpose of avoiding or preventing an arrest or effecting an escape from custody.
The murder was committed for pecuniary gain.
The murder was committed for the purpose of disrupting or hindering the lawful exercise of any government or political function.
The murder was committed in an especially cruel or depraved manner, that is, preceded by mental anguish, serious physical abuse, or torture upon the victim prior to the murder.
The murder was committed by means of a destructive device, bomb, explosive, or similar device that the person planted, hid, or concealed in any place, area, dwelling, building, or structure, or mailed or delivered, or caused to be planted, hidden, concealed, mailed, or delivered, and the person knew that his or her act would create a great risk of death to human life.
The murder was committed against a person whom the defendant knew or reasonably should have known was especially vulnerable to the attack because:
Of either a temporary or permanent severe physical or mental disability which would interfere with the victim's ability to flee or to defend himself or herself; or
The victim was 12 years of age or younger.

Death row

Male death row inmates are located at the Arkansas Department of Correction Varner Unit's Supermax, while the executions are performed at the Cummins Unit, adjacent to Varner. The female death row is located at the McPherson Unit. In 1999 the female death row was newly inaugurated.

In 1974, male death row inmates previously at the Tucker Unit, were moved to the Cummins Unit. In 1986, male death row inmates were moved to the Maximum Security Unit. On Friday August 22, 2003, all 39 Arkansas death row inmates, all of them male, were moved to the Supermax at the Varner Unit.

See also 
 List of people executed in Arkansas
 List of death row inmates in Arkansas
 Crime in Arkansas
 Law of Arkansas

References

External links
Executions in Arkansas 1820–1964
Post-Furman Botched Executions  from Death Penalty Information Center
Death row inmates from Arkansas Department of Correction
Arkansas's Electric Chairs
2007 Facts Brochure. Arkansas Department of Correction. Retrieved on 2007-11-13.

 
Arkansas
Arkansas law